"Don't Let It Get You Down" is a single by Echo & the Bunnymen which was released in November 1997. It was the third single released after Ian McCulloch, Will Sergeant and Les Pattinson reformed the band. It was also the third single to be released from their 1997 album,  Evergreen. It reached number 50 on the UK Singles Chart.

Overview
Like their previous two singles, "Nothing Lasts Forever" and "I Want to Be There", the single was released on London Records as a 7-inch single and as two separate CD versions – apart from the title track all three releases had different track listings and each with a different cover.

The B-side to the 7-inch single is a demo version of the title track and the extra tracks of both CDs are live tracks taken from their 1997 appearance at the Glastonbury Festival.

Written by Will Sergeant, Ian McCulloch and Les Pattinson, the title track was also self-produced by the band. It was mixed by Clif Norrell. The photography for the CD covers was done by Norman Watson.

Track listings
All tracks written by Will Sergeant, Ian McCulloch and Les Pattinson except where noted.

7-inch release (London LON406 and 570 044-7)
"Don't Let It Get You Down"
"Don't Let It Get You Down" (demo version)

CD No. 1 release (London LONCD406)
"Don't Let It Get You Down" – 3:53
"Rescue" (live) (Sergeant, McCulloch, Pattinson, Pete de Freitas) – 4:04
"Altamont" (live) (Sergeant, McCulloch, Pattinson, de Freitas) – 3:37

CD No. 2 release (London LOCDP406)
"Don't Let It Get You Down" – 3:54
"The Back of Love" (live) (Sergeant, McCulloch, Pattinson, de Freitas) – 3:10
"Over the Wall" (live) (Sergeant, McCulloch, Pattinson, de Freitas) – 6:55

Chart positions

Personnel

Musicians
Ian McCulloch – vocals, guitar
Will Sergeant – lead guitar
Les Pattinson – bass

Production
Echo & the Bunnymen – producer
Clif Norrell – mixed by
Norman Watson – photography

References

External links

1997 singles
Echo & the Bunnymen songs
Songs written by Ian McCulloch (singer)
Songs written by Will Sergeant
Songs written by Les Pattinson